The first USS Rondo (SP-90), later USS SP-90, was an armed motorboat that served in the United States Navy as a patrol vessel from 1917 to 1919.
 
Rondo was a civilian motorboat built in 1915 by the Rhode River Shipbuilding Company on the Rhode River in Maryland. The U.S. Navy acquired her on 16 May 1917 for World War I service as a patrol boat, and commissioned as USS Rondo (SP-90) on 14 November 1917.

Rondo served on patrol duty in Florida waters, operating out of Key West, Marathon, Long Key, and Bahia Honda Viaduct at Bahia Honda Key, through the end of the war. In April 1918, she was renamed USS SP-90, presumably to avoid confusion with the cargo ship USS Rondo (ID-2488), which was commissioned the previous month.

While anchored in North Beach Basin at Key West on 9 September 1919, SP-90 was among eight patrol boats completely destroyed by a hurricane.  All recovered wreckage from SP-90 and the other seven boats was burned or turned into stores.

SP-90 was stricken from the Navy List on 4 October 1919.

References

Department of the Navy: Naval Historical Center: Online Library of Selected Images: U.S. Navy Ships: USS Rondo (SP-90), 1917-1919. Later renamed SP-90. Originally the civilian motor boat Rondo.
NavSource Online: Section Patrol Craft Photo Archive: Rondo (SP 90)

Patrol vessels of the United States Navy
World War I patrol vessels of the United States
Ships built in Maryland
1915 ships